, known mononymously as Mackenyu, is an American-born Japanese actor. He is the son of Japanese actor, producer, director, and martial artist Sonny Chiba. His name "真剣佑" roughly translates to "True Sword Savior".  Mackenyu rose to fame after portraying Wataya Arata in the Chihayafuru live-action trilogy in 2016, which earned him the 40th Japan Academy Newcomers of the Year Award in 2017. He is best known for portraying Enishi Yukishiro, the final villain of the Rurouni Kenshin live-action series in Rurouni Kenshin Saishūshō: The Final.

Early life
Mackenyu Maeda, known as Mackenyu Arata, was born on November 16, 1996, in Los Angeles,. He is the son of Japanese parents, Tamami Chiba and Sonny Chiba, and has two siblings, a half sister named Juri Manase (his father's daughter from previous marriage) and a brother named Gordon. He attended Beverly Hills High School in their Advanced Placement Program and appeared in a few films and TV shows while growing up, including the TV mini-series Team Astro (Astro Kyūdan) (2005), and the Japanese feature film Oyaji (2007), as he devoted most of his time to school and graduation. As a young child, Mackenyu had many interests. He learned horseback riding and Yabusame at the age of 7. He practiced Kyokushin Karate since he was 8 years-old, and he was placed third at the US kyokushin Karate Nationals in middle school. In high school he did gymnastics, water polo, and wrestling, becoming the school representative for the latter. He was also into music, playing piano since he was 10-years-old, and later participated in the brass band of his high school in Beverly Hills, playing saxophone, and flute.

At the age of 15, Mackenyu watched a Japanese movie and the actor who star in it inspired him to pursue acting professionally in Japan. He held on to the dream of co-starring with the actor once he established his acting career in Japan. He later revealed that it was the late Haruma Miura after he co-starred with him in the movie adaptation of Gunjō Senki.

In 2014 at the age of 16, Mackenyu landed his first feature film lead role in Take a Chance (2015) and was featured in an acclaimed short movie depicting a Japanese family suffering the aftermath of the World War II in Tadaima (2015) in which the movie won The Best Narrative Short in Philadelphia Asian American Film Festival. In the same year, he decided to pursue acting in Japan, stating that Japan would be the best place for him to learn due to the variety of roles that is available for young actors.

Personal life 
He married a non-celebrity woman (name not disclosed) that he has been dating for a long time. The marriage was announced in January 2023.

Career
In 2013, Mackenyu turned his full attention to acting—including roles in the feature film Buzz (So-On: The Five Oyaji) (2014) and TV movie Yo nimo Kimyō na Monogatari (2014). His acting quickly expanded to include three supporting roles in TV Mini-series including The Kindergarten Detective (Hanasaki Shin'ichirō wa Nemurenai!!) (2015), Yume o Ataeru (2015), and The Hatsumori Bemars (2015). His fame grew dramatically in Japan after landing the role of Eiji Tomari/Kamen Rider Dark Drive in the live action movie based on the popular series created by manga artist Shotaro Ishinomori, Kamen Rider Drive: Surprise Future (Gekijōban Kamen Rider Drive: Surprise Future) (2015).

In 2015, he also landed his first lead roles in two USA film productions, Take a Chance (2015) and Tadaima (2015); for the latter he won a best supporting actor award at the Asians of Films festival. In January 2016, he made his stage debut in the Japanese musical Boys Over Flower (Hana Yori Dango: The Musical) (2016). He had a prominent role in the two part feature film Chihayafuru Part I & II (2016) which was released back-to-back in March and April 2016. Japan's AM magazine featured him on the front cover of their 14 March 2016 edition and included an interview with him. One of his most challenging roles in his career to date was Shōjo (Little Girl). Having completed his lead role as "Makise" in the feature film Night's Tightrope (Shōjo) (2016), Mackenyu started to expand his acting opportunities in Hollywood with a supporting role of Cadet Ryoichi in the science fiction film Pacific Rim: Uprising (2018). 2018 was a busy year with series Kiss That Kills and movies Chihayafuru Part III, manga-based Impossibility Defense and speed-drive action-drama Over Drive.

In 2019, he was cast as the final villain, Enishi Yukishiro, in the last two movies of Rurouni Kenshin live action.

In December 2020, Mackenyu announced that he would be leaving his agency, Top Coat, in April 2021 as well as suspending his Japanese activities for the time being. He announced that he wants to focus on global activities in 2021.

In 2021, he starred as the lead in the manga adaptation of Brave: Gunjou Senki. He is now in Asian Cinema Entertainment.  In November 2021, Mackenyu was cast as Roronoa Zoro in the American Netflix live action series adaptation of One Piece.

In March 2022, he was cast as Scar in the live-action sequel of Fullmetal Alchemist

Brand endorsements
In 2018, Mackenyu became the brand ambassador for Japanese men's grooming brand GATSBY. He starred in the TV commercial "GATSBY Cop", together with popular Japanese actor Yuya Yagira.

Filmography

Film

Television

Awards

References

External links
  
 
 
 
 

1996 births
Living people
American male actors of Japanese descent
American male film actors
American male television actors
Beverly Hills High School alumni
Japanese male child actors
Japanese male film actors
Japanese male television actors
21st-century American male actors
21st-century Japanese male actors